State Route 131 (SR 131) is a south-to-north highway in the U.S. state of Tennessee that is  long. It is designated as a secondary route.

Local names for the roads followed by portions of the route are Lovell Road, Ball Camp-Byington Road, Beaver Ridge Road, Emory Road, Powell Drive, Tazewell Pike, Clinch Valley Road, and Mountain Valley Highway 131.

Route description

Knox County

SR 131 begins in Knox County on the Farragut/Knoxville city line, at an intersection with US 11/US 70/SR 1 (Kingston Pike). It then goes north to enter Knoxville as a 4-lane (Lovell Road) and comes to an intersection with Parkside Drive, which provides access to the Turkey Creek shopping area. It then curves to the northwest and goes through a small business district before having an interchange with I-40/I-75 (Exit 374). SR 131 continues north through an industrial area before leaving Knoxville and continuing north, passing by various subdivisions. It then comes to an interchange with SR 162 (Pellissippi Parkway) before narrowing to a 2-lane. It then passes some more subdivisions before coming to an intersection with SR 169 (Middlebrook Pike), with that highway ending here and SR 131 taking over its route for a short distance to the west, again as a 4-lane, before turning north on Byington Beaver Ridge Road as a narrow 2-lane country road. SR 131 then makes a dangerous and sharp switchback under a low and narrow railroad overpass before entering Karns and coming to an intersection with SR 62 (Oak Ridge Highway). It then goes northwest for a short distance before making a sharp turn onto Emory Road and becoming a wider and improved 2-lane. SR 131 then leaves Karns and continues through the countryside of northern Knox County before entering Powell and having an intersection and becoming concurrent with US 25W/SR 9 (Clinton Highway). They go southeast and come to an intersection where Emory Road splits off and goes north into downtown, which was the former route of SR 131 until a new bypass was built to the east in 2016. They then cross Beaver Creek over a bridge and pass several businesses before SR 131 splits off onto Powell Drive (the new bypass, which is a 4-lane). It then passes through farmland, passing by Crown College, before meeting back up with Emory Road and following it once again continue northeast. They then enter another business district and come to another interchange with I-75 (Exit 112) before passing by North Knoxville Medical Center and more subdivisions before leaving Powell. SR 131 then goes through some farmland and countryside before entering Halls Crossroads (Halls) and coming to an intersection with US 441/SR 71 (Norris Freeway, which is not an actual freeway). SR 131 then narrows to a 2-lane and passes by some businesses before having an intersection with Andersonville Pike. It then makes a sharp curve to the east and comes to an intersection with SR 33 (Maynardville Pike). It then passes some more businesses before leaving Halls Crossroads and continuing northeast through the countryside as an improved 2-lane. SR 131 then enters Corryton and comes to an intersection with SR 331 (Tazewell Pike), where SR 131 and SR 331 actually swap routes, with SR 131 taking over Tazewell Pike and going north and SR 331 taking over Emory Road and going east into the center of Corryton. SR 131 then becomes a little curvy as it finally leaves Knox County and Corryton to enter Union County.

Union County

SR 131 stays curvy and narrow as it immediately enters Plainview and intersects SR 144 (Ailor Gap Road). It then passes through Plainview before coming to an intersection and becoming concurrent with SR 61 (Main Street) just north of Luttrell. SR 61 and SR 131 split a short distance later and SR 131 (now as Clinch Valley Road) continues east and crosses into Grainger County.

Grainger County

Still a narrow country 2-lane, SR 131 travels through the farmland of a narrow valley, through the community of Powder Springs, passes just south of the communities of Tater Valley and Liberty Hill, and goes through the town of Washburn before coming to an intersection with US 25E/SR 32 (Dixie Highway) in Thorn Hill. SR 131 then continues east (now as Mountain Valley Highway 131) through some more rolling farmland before crossing into Hancock County.

Hancock County

It then continues through more farmland before entering Treadway and ending at an intersection with SR 31 (Flat Gap Road), where the road continues east as Mountain Valley Road.

Junction list

See also

References

 Tennessee Department of Transportation (24 January 2003). "State Highway and Interstate List 2003".

External links
 Tennessee Department of Transportation

131
Transportation in Knox County, Tennessee
Transportation in Union County, Tennessee
Transportation in Grainger County, Tennessee
Transportation in Hancock County, Tennessee